Peckhamia is a genus of jumping spiders that was first described by Eugène Louis Simon in 1900. It is named in honor of George and Elizabeth Peckham, and is considered a senior synonym of the genus Consingis.

Species
 it contains nine species, found in North America, Central America, Suriname, Argentina, Brazil, and on Hispaniola:
Peckhamia americana (Peckham & Peckham, 1892) – USA, Mexico, Hispaniola
Peckhamia argentinensis Galiano, 1986 – Argentina
Peckhamia picata (Hentz, 1846) – North America
Peckhamia prescotti Chickering, 1946 – El Salvador, Panama
Peckhamia scorpionia (Hentz, 1846) (type) – USA, Canada
Peckhamia semicana (Simon, 1900) – Brazil, Argentina
Peckhamia seminola Gertsch, 1936 – USA
Peckhamia soesilae Makhan, 2006 – Suriname
Peckhamia variegata (F. O. Pickard-Cambridge, 1900) – Panama

References

External links
 Painting of P. prescotti
 Pictures of P. americana

Salticidae genera
Salticidae
Spiders of North America
Spiders of South America